Zbigniew Franciszek Wassermann (17 September 1949 – 10 April 2010) was a Polish politician. He was an MP representing Law and Justice (Prawo i Sprawiedliwość).

Wassermann was born in Kraków.  He was a graduate in law from Jagiellonian University (Uniwersytet Jagielloński, Wydział Prawa) and member of Sejm, lower house of Polish parliament, elected in Krakow constituency.

From July 2004, he was a member and the vice-chairman of PKN Orlen investigation commission. From November 2005 to November 2007 he was Minister of Special Forces in the Governments of Kazimierz Marcinkiewicz and Jaroslaw Kaczynski.

He was listed on the flight manifest of the Tupolev Tu-154 of the 36th Special Aviation Regiment carrying the President of Poland Lech Kaczyński which crashed near Smolensk-North airport near Pechersk near Smolensk, Russia, on 10 April 2010, killing all aboard.

On 16 April 2010 Wassermann was decorated posthumously with the Commander's Cross of the Order of Polonia Restituta and on 20 April 2010 he was buried in a cemetery in Krakow Bielany.

References

External links 
 Official Sejm page
 http://ludzie.wprost.pl/sylwetka/?O=34328
 http://wiadomosci.wp.pl/kat,23234,wid,8069897,wiadomosc.html?ticaid=12ce4

1949 births
2010 deaths
Politicians from Kraków
Law and Justice politicians
Members of the Polish Sejm 2001–2005
Members of the Polish Sejm 2005–2007
Commanders of the Order of Polonia Restituta
Victims of the Smolensk air disaster
Jagiellonian University alumni
Members of the Polish Sejm 2007–2011